A Massachusetts general election was held on November 5, 2002 in the Commonwealth of Massachusetts.

The election included:
 statewide elections for U.S. Senator, Governor, Lieutenant Governor, Attorney General, Secretary of the Commonwealth, Treasurer, and Auditor;
 district elections for U.S. Representatives, State Representatives, State Senators, and Governor's Councillors; and
 ballot questions at the state and local levels.

Democratic and Republican candidates were selected in party primaries held September 17, 2002.

Governor & Lieutenant Governor

Republicans Mitt Romney and Kerry Healey were elected Governor and Lieutenant Governor, respectively, over Democratic candidates Shannon O'Brien and Chris Gabrieli, Green-Rainbow candidates Jill Stein and Tony Lorenzen, Libertarian candidates Carla Howell and Rich Aucoin, and independent candidates Barbara C. Johnson and Joe Schebel.

Secretary of the Commonwealth
Democrat William F. Galvin was re-elected Secretary of the Commonwealth for a third term. He defeated Perennial candidate Jack E. Robinson III in the general election.

Attorney General
Democrat Thomas Reilly ran unopposed.

Treasurer and Receiver-General

Democratic primary

Candidates
Michael P. Cahill, State Representative from Beverly
Timothy P. Cahill, Norfolk County Treasurer
Jim Segel, former State Representative from Brookline and Executive Director of the Massachusetts Municipal Association
Stephen J. Murphy, Member of the Boston City Council

Results

Republican primary

Candidates
Dan Grabauskas, Massachusetts Registrar of Motor Vehicles
Bruce A. Herzfelder, businessman

Results

General election

Results

Auditor
Democrat A. Joseph DeNucci was re-elected Auditor. He defeated Libertarian Kamal Jain and Independent John James Xenakis.

United States Senator

Democratic incumbent John Kerry was re-elected over his Libertarian challenger Michael Cloud.

United States House of Representatives

Massachusetts Senate
see 2002 Massachusetts Senate election

Massachusetts House of Representatives
see 2002 Massachusetts House election

Governor's Council
See 2002 Massachusetts Governor's Council election

Ballot measures
There were three statewide ballot questions, all initiatives, which Massachusetts voters considered in this election. There were also various local ballot questions around the Commonwealth.

Question 1
Abolishing the state income tax. A law to eliminate any state personal income tax for income or other gain realized on or after July 1, 2003.

Question 2
English Language Education in Public Schools Initiative: Abolishing bilingual education and replacing it with a one-year program of rapid English immersion. A law that would require that, with limited exceptions, all public-school children must be taught all subjects in English.

Question 3
Taxpayer funding for Clean Elections. A non-binding question relative to the funding of political campaigns for public office.

References

External links
 

 
Massachusetts